Macarostola japonica is a species of moth of the family Gracillariidae. It is native to Japan (Honshū and Satunan).

The wingspan is 9–10 mm.

The larvae feed on Euscaphis japonica. There are four or five instars. In the first two instars the larvae have a flat head and feed on sap, and in the third to supposed fifth instars they feed on tissue, with a round head and a cylindrical body as in usual lepidopterous larvae. The mine starts as a tortuous serpentine mine, which is located inside the lower epidermis of a leaf and is whitish in colour. The second instar larva expands the linear mine to an elongated blotch along the leaf-margin. In this stage the mine occupies the lower layer of spongy parenchyma. The larva of the third instar feeds on the whole parenchymal tissues remaining inside the blotch-mine, then makes it into a tentiform type. After the third moult, the larva leaves the mine through a round hole and migrates to another leaf, which it cuts from the edge towards the midrib. This cut edge is rolled to form a cone on the underside of the leaf, then the larva continues to feed inside the cone. When full-grown the larva leaves the cone to pupate. Pupation takes place at a margin of the same leaf or another one. The cocoon is whitish, boat-shaped, without any bubbles on its upper side.

References

Macarostola
Moths of Japan
Moths described in 1977